During World War II, the United States Army Air Forces (USAAF) established numerous airfields in Michigan for training pilots and aircrews of USAAF fighters and bombers.

Most of these airfields were under the command of First Air Force or the Army Air Forces Training Command (AAFTC) (a predecessor of the current-day United States Air Force Air Education and Training Command). Other USAAF support commands (Air Technical Service Command (ATSC); Air Transport Command (ATC) or Troop Carrier Command) commanded a significant number of airfields in support roles.

Remnants of these wartime airfields exist. Many were converted into municipal airports, some were returned to agriculture, and several were retained as United States Air Force installations and were front-line bases during the Cold War. Hundreds of the temporary buildings that were used survive today, and are being used for other purposes.

Major airfields

Air Technical Service Command
 Alpena AAF, Alpena
 100th Base Headquarters and Air Base Squadron
 Now: Alpena County Regional Airport 
 Kinross AAF, Kinross
 Sub-base of Alpena AAF, Phelps Collins CTRC
 Was: Kinross Air Force Base (1947-1959)
 Was: Kincheloe Air Force Base (1959-1977)
 Now: Chippewa County International Airport 
Raco AAF, Raco
 Sub-base of Alpena AAF
 Was: Used by Michigan National Guard and byKincheloe AFB as a BOMARC missile site.  Closed 1972.
 Now: Non-aviation useOld runways used for automotive testing.
 Grayling AAF, Grayling
  still active United States Army airfield (did not xfer to USAF), part of Camp Grayling
 Tri-City AAF, Saginaw
 Now: MBS International Airport 

Troop Carrier Command
 Kellogg AAF, Battle Creek
 Troop Carrier Training
 321st Base Headquarters and Air Base Squadron
 Now: W. K. Kellogg Airport / Battle Creek Air National Guard Base 

First Air Force
 Selfridge AAF, Mt. Clemens
 4th Base Headquarters and Air Base Squadron
 Was Selfridge Air Force Base (1947-1971)
 Now:  Selfridge Air National Guard Base (1971-present)
 Oscoda AAF, Oscoda
 524th Base Headquarters and Air Base Squadron (reduced)
 Sub-base of Selfridge AAF
 Was: Oscoda Air Force Base (1947-1953)
 Was: Wurtsmith Air Force Base (1953-1993)
 Now: Oscoda-Wurtsmith Airport 

Army Air Force Training Command
 Willow Run Airport, Ypsilanti, Michigan
 Eastern Technical Training Command
 484th Base Headquarters and Air Base Squadron
 Now: Public Airport Also home of the Yankee Air Museum

Air Transport Command
 Romulus AAF, Detroit
 3d Ferrying Group
 345th Base Headquarters and Air Base Squadron
 Joint Use USAAF/Civil Airport
 Now: Detroit Metropolitan Wayne County Airport

See also
Naval Air Station Grosse Ile

References
 Maurer, Maurer (1983). Air Force Combat Units Of World War II. Maxwell AFB, Alabama: Office of Air Force History. .
 Ravenstein, Charles A. (1984). Air Force Combat Wings Lineage and Honors Histories 1947-1977. Maxwell AFB, Alabama: Office of Air Force History. .
 Thole, Lou (1999), Forgotten Fields of America : World War II Bases and Training, Then and Now - Vol. 2.  Pictorial Histories Pub . 
 Military Airfields in World War II - Michigan

External links

 01
World War II Army Airfields
World War II Army Airfields
World War II Army Airfields
Airfields of the United States Army Air Forces in the United States by state
United States World War II army airfields